India sent a delegation to the 1968 Summer Paralympics in Tel Aviv, Israel from November 4 to 13, 1968. 
Ten Indian athletes competed, eight men and two women. The team did not win any medals.

See also 
 India at the 1968 Summer Olympics

Notes

References

Nations at the 1968 Summer Paralympics
1968
Paralympics